Emel Dereli (born February 25, 1996) is a Turkish female track and field athlete competing in shot put and occasionally in discus throw. For the shot put event, she holds a world record in the cadets and a national record in the juniors category. Since 2012, she is a member of Fenerbahçe Athletics. She is coached by İhsan Özden.

Career
Dereli was born in Zonguldak, where she is a student at Vocational High School for Commerce in Zonguldak. She began shot put in 2008, and two years later she was called up for the Turkey national team. She won more than fifty medals at national and international competitions in different age categories.

Dereli took the gold medal in the under 23 category at the 2013 European Cup Winter Throwing held in Castellón, Spain.

She won the gold medal and set a championship record in the shot put 3 kg event at the 2013 World Youth Championships in Athletics in Donetsk, Ukraine. She is the second ever shot putter in the world exceeding the 20 m mark in the cadets category.

At the 2013 European Athletics Junior Championships in Rieti, Italy, she won the gold medal and set a new national record for with 18.04 m.

Dereli won the bronze in the shot put event at the 2016 European Athletics Championships in Amsterdam, Netherlands.

International competitions

References

External links

Dereli Emel at All-Athletics

1996 births
Living people
Sportspeople from Zonguldak
Turkish female shot putters
Turkish female discus throwers
Fenerbahçe athletes
World Athletics Championships athletes for Turkey
European Athletics Championships medalists
Athletes (track and field) at the 2016 Summer Olympics
Olympic athletes of Turkey
Athletes (track and field) at the 2020 Summer Olympics
Olympic female shot putters
21st-century Turkish sportswomen
Islamic Solidarity Games medalists in athletics